The Brețcu is a left tributary of the Râul Negru in Romania. It flows into the Râul Negru east of Lunga.

References

Rivers of Romania
Rivers of Covasna County